The 2020 Campeonato Paraibano de Futebol was the 110th edition of Paraíba's top professional football league. The competition began on 21 January and ended on 15 August.

Botafogo-PB were defending champions, after winning the 2019 final against Campinense.

The season was suspended indefinitely on 18 March 2020 due to the COVID-19 pandemic. On 18 June 2020, the Federação Paraibana announced that the competition would restart on 18 July.

Treze were crowned champions after beating Campinense 2–1 in the two-legged final.

Format
The competition was divided into a number of stages.

In the first (group) stage, the ten teams were divided into two groups of five. Each team played the five teams in the other group, home and away, for a total of ten games. The teams that finished first and second in each group qualified directly for the second (semi-final) stage. The teams that finished last in each group were relegated to the second division.

In the second (semi-final) stage, the winner of each group played the runner up of their group over two games, home and away. The group winner had home advantage in the second leg.

In the third (final) stage, the two winning teams from the second (semi-final) stage played over two legs, with the team with the best record in the competition so far playing the second leg at home.

Qualification
The two finalists, Treze and Campinense qualified to participate in the 2021 Copa do Brasil and 2021 Copa do Nordeste. The two best placed teams (other than those already participating in a national league), Campinense and Sousa qualified to participate in the 2021 Campeonato Brasileiro Série D.

Participating teams

First stage

Group A

Group B

Semi-finals
In the semi-final stage, the winner of each group will play the runner up of their group over two games, home and away. The group winner has home advantage in the second leg.

Semi-finals were originally scheduled to be played between 5 April and 12 April 2020. They will now be played on 31 July and 4 August 2020.

|}

Final
The final will take place over two games, home and away, and the team with the best record in the competition has home advantage in the second leg.

The final was originally scheduled to take place on 19 and 26 April 2020. They will now be played on 12 and 15 August 2020.

|}

References

Paraíba
2020
Campeonato Paraibano